Dario Cerrato, (born 2 September 1951) is a former Italian rally driver three times on the podium in World Rally Championship races. He won five times the Italian Rally Championship.

WRC podium

Other results
European Rally Championship
2 wins (1985, 1987)

 Italian Rally Championship
5 wins (1985, 1986, 1988, 1989, 1990, 1991)

References

External links
 Driver profile  at Rallye-info.com

1951 births
Italian rally drivers
Living people
World Rally Championship drivers
European Rally Championship drivers